This is a list of Mexican football transfers for the 2019–20 winter transfer window, grouped by club. It includes football transfers related to clubs from the Liga Bancomer MX and the Ascenso MX.

Liga Bancomer MX

América

In:

 

Out:

References 

Winter 2019-20
Mexico
Tran